Ngauranga is a suburb of New Zealand's capital city, Wellington, in the lower North Island.  Situated on the western bank of Wellington Harbour, it lies to the north of the centre of the city. The name comes from the Maori-language ngā ūranga, meaning "the landing place (for canoes)".  The Ngauranga Railway Station was known as "Ngahauranga" when it opened in 1874.

It is lightly populated, and for statistical purposes is divided into Ngauranga East and Ngauranga West by Statistics New Zealand.  At the 2001 New Zealand census, Ngauranga West registered a population of zero, while Ngauranga East had a population of 39.  This represented an increase of 18.2% or 6 people since the previous census in 1996.

The low population is due to Ngauranga's rugged terrain. It includes the Ngauranga Gorge, through which State Highway 1 passes on its route out of Wellington to Porirua and the west coast.  To the east, State Highway 2 runs wedged between hills and Wellington Harbour on its route from Wellington to the Hutt Valley, Wairarapa, and beyond.

Alongside State Highway 2 is the Hutt Valley Line portion of the Wairarapa Line railway, which includes a station in Ngauranga served by frequent commuter trains.  The North Island Main Trunk railway also passes through Ngauranga, via two tunnels of the Tawa Flat deviation, with a bridge between them crossing the Ngauranga Gorge.

The small amount of usable land in Ngauranga is primarily used for commercial and industrial activity, though there are some houses on the hill overlooking the motorway.

Transport
Ngauranga has the southern junction of SH1 and SH2.

Rail
Ngauranga is also served by rail. Ngauranga has one railway station, Ngauranga Railway Station.

See also 
Ngauranga Gorge

References

External links 
History of Ngauranga (page down)
 

Suburbs of Wellington City
Populated places around the Wellington Harbour